Alaca is a town in Çorum Province in the Black Sea region of Turkey. It is the seat of Alaca District. Its population is 19,510 (2022).

The ancient Hittite settlement of Alaca Höyük is located in Alaca District.

Population

References

External links
Municipality's official website
AlacaNET.com - City Web Portal

Populated places in Çorum Province
Alaca District
Towns in Turkey